Impressment by the Royal Navy in Nova Scotia happened primarily during the American Revolution and the Napoleonic Wars.  Guard boats patrolled Halifax harbour day and night and they boarded all incoming and outgoing vessels.  The Navy always struggled with desertion in Nova Scotia, and it often threatened to use impressment as a punishment for communities that harboured and assisted deserters. The Navy used guard boats as floating press gangs, conscripting every fiftieth man out of ships entering the harbour. It even pressed Americans from cartels and prison hulks. Warships shot at vessels to bring them to, damaging their sails and rigging, and at least one fisherman was pressed while checking his nets. 

British warships sent armed press gangs into Halifax, where they fought with townspeople. The incidents were frequently violent and people were killed. The press gangs would drive all before them in the streets.  The press gangs would bind recruits' hands behind their backs and march them through the street like criminals. 

Impressment caused socioeconomic problems in Nova Scotia.  For sailors, it was often a violent and life-altering experience. They potentially faced years in the service, forced separation from their families and friends, and death through disease and combat.  Civil and personal liberties were suspended for the good of the British war effort.  Generally, impressment victims were young men from poor and middle-class backgrounds.  Often impacting sailors and fishermen, they supported family members and widowed mothers, and were often married with young children.  Dozens of families in Liverpool alone were torn apart by impressment during the Napoleonic Wars.

American Revolution 

Planters and other Nova Scotians were exempted from naval service during the 1760s, but impressment became a serious threat during the American Revolution. The American conflict severed the Royal Navy from its traditional labour market in North America, which pressured loyalist colonies such as Nova Scotia and Newfoundland to make up for the shortage of manpower. By August 1775, the Nova Scotia government received a petition from Halifax merchants complaining about impressment. The issue came to a head in October when the Assembly petitioned Governor Francis Legge to put a stop to impressment in Nova Scotia. 

By 1776 the Navy used guard boats as floating press gangs, conscripting every fiftieth man from ships entering the harbour.  It even pressed Americans from cartels and prison hulks. Still in need of men, warships sent armed press gangs into Halifax, where they fought with townspeople. In 1778, Lieutenant-Governor Richard Hughes lashed out at the Navy for press gang incidents that were frequently marked by quarrels, bloodshed and the loss of life.  Hughes complained that press gangs caused social unrest in Halifax and he banned them from shore unless they had colonial permission. The press gangs would drive all before them in the streets.  The Halifax grand jury condemned the Navy for its disrespect of provincial and municipal authority, and also for binding recruits’ hands behind their backs and marching them through the street like criminals.   

The Royal Navy pressed approximately 200 Liverpool residents in the 18th and 19th centuries.   Liverpool experienced more of these naval intrusions than other regional ports in British North America. At least two dozen of Liverpool's pressed sailors died in the British fleet or were never heard from again. For the Planters who settled in Liverpool in the 1760s, they were largely protected from press gangs based on age, social status, and colonial exemptions, but their sons and descendants had a much tougher time with the Navy. Impressment took a serious toll on Liverpool.  

Outside of Halifax, during the American Revolution the Navy concentrated its recruitment efforts on coastal shipping and small ports such as Liverpool. In one instance, HM sloop Senegal was in Liverpool for about four months and impressment loomed as a threat the entire time.  It pressed three men there and in the neighbouring villages of Port Medway, Port Mouton, and Brooklyn. Another ship, HMS Blonde, during the late 1770s, cruised extensively in the St. Lawrence River and coastal Nova Scotia, entering dozens of recruits at Halifax and from ships and towns along the South Shore.
 
Impressment damaged Nova Scotia trade, but the Navy's inability to stop Yankee privateers was a much larger concern.  Privateers captured hundreds of vessels and made bold amphibious assaults on Liverpool in 1780 and Lunenburg in 1782. Although Halifax led the way, Liverpool sent out five privateers during the war, including Lucy, a schooner of 18 guns and 50 men. There was intense competition for sailors from trading vessels and the Navy.

As a merchant, Simeon Perkins attempted to protect the citizens of Liverpool from the press gangs. He issued papers saying that sailors were master, mates and apprentices, or under the age of 18, all of whom were exempted from impressment.  Fraudulent protections were common. In 1800, however, Liverpool privateers had a large portion of their crews pressed. 80 men were pressed over the year. The privateer Duke of Kents encounter with HMS Nereide was the deadliest for Liverpool: of the 20 pressed sailors, nine returned home at various times, eight died, and three were never heard from again.

Napoleonic Wars 
Governor Wentworth and his council issued at least 13 warrants between 1793 and 1805. Only sailors could be taken into service. The Navy used guard boats to press at sea, over which Nova Scotia had no jurisdiction.  Wentworth did succeed in protecting many groups from impressment: freeholders, militiamen, market boat crews and even the Dartmouth ferry operator.  This exempted most Nova Scotians from impressment during the Napoleonic period, but it also prevented the Navy from keeping its ships manned and ready for duty. 

George sent press gangs from Hussar into Halifax. In one night they detained 50 to 60 men, including several Liverpool mariners, and brought them aboard Hussar. Liverpool sailors also stood in constant fear of press gangs and guard boats at Halifax and often refused to sail there based on rumours of impressment. Vice-Admiral George Berkely declared in 1806, unless he sent these small warships to maritime communities and regional shipping lanes to press sailors, there was no hope of manning the North American squadron.

Halifax Impressment Riot 

The Navy's manning problems in Nova Scotia peaked in 1805. Warships were short-handed from high desertion rates, and naval captains were handicapped in filling those vacancies by provincial impressment regulations. Desperate for sailors, the Navy pressed them all over the North Atlantic region in 1805, from Halifax and Charlottetown to Saint John and Quebec City. In early May, Vice Admiral Andrew Mitchell sent press gangs from several warships into downtown Halifax. They conscripted men first and asked questions later, rounding up dozens of potential recruits.

Wentworth lashed out at the admiral for sparking urban unrest and breaking provincial impressment laws, and his government exploited this violent episode to put even tighter restrictions of recruiting in Nova Scotia. 

Stemming from impressment disturbances, civil-naval relations deteriorated in Nova Scotia from 1805 to the War of 1812.  was in Liverpool for only about a week, but it terrified the small town the entire time, and naval impressment remained a serious threat to sailors along the South Shore.  After leaving Liverpool, Whiting terrorized Shelburne by pressing inhabitants, breaking into homes, and forcing more than a dozen families to live in the forest to avoid further harassment.

War of 1812 
By the War of 1812, even the Navy had publicly exempted Nova Scotians from impressment, and groups such as the Society of Merchants campaigned against naval abuses in Nova Scotia. Not surprisingly, as warships were short-handed, naval captains began to violate impressment regulations in the final years of the Napoleonic Wars. Impressment had a negative impact on privateers in the War of 1812: dozens of men were forced into the British fleet, fear of impressment caused recruitment problems and desertions from the privateer vessels, the disputes with the Navy hindered the privateer’s ability to attack enemy shipping and protect themselves against American Warships.

Endnotes

References

 Keith Mercer. Planters and Press Gangs: A Social History of Naval Impressment in Liverpool, Nova Scotia, 1759-1815. In Henderson, S. and Robicheau, W. (eds.) The Nova Scotia Planters in the Atlantic World, 1759-1830. Acadiensis Press. 2012. pp. 205–242.
 Keith Mercer, "Northern Exposure: Resistance to Naval Impressment in British North America, 1775–1815," Canadian Historical Review, June 2010, Vol. 91 Issue 2, pp. 199–232. 
  Keith Mercer. North Atlantic Press Gangs: Impressment and Naval-Civilian Relations in Nova Scotia and Newfoundland, 1749-1815

History of Halifax, Nova Scotia
Military history of Nova Scotia
Conscription in Canada